Georgi Chukalov (born 25 February 1998) is a Bulgarian footballer who plays as a midfielder.

Career
Chukalov bеgan his career with Botev Plovdiv, but later moved to Lokomotiv Plovdiv. On 17 May 2015, he made his A Group debut in a game against Marek Dupnitsa. In January 2017, Chukalov moved to Slavia Sofia and quickly established himself in the U19 team.  However, as he couldn't break into the first team, he joined Lokomotiv Gorna Oryahovitsa in July.

In January 2022 Chukanov joined Spartak Varna, coming on loan from Ludogorets Razgrad.

Career statistics

Club

References

External links

Living people
1998 births
Footballers from Plovdiv
Bulgarian footballers
Bulgaria youth international footballers
Association football midfielders
PFC Lokomotiv Plovdiv players
FC Lokomotiv Gorna Oryahovitsa players
PFC Ludogorets Razgrad players
PFC Ludogorets Razgrad II players
FC Arda Kardzhali players
FC Pomorie players
PFC Spartak Varna players
First Professional Football League (Bulgaria) players